Kosmach is a village located in Kosiv Raion, Ivano-Frankivsk Oblast, Ukraine. It hosts the administration of Kosmach rural hromada, one of the hromadas of Ukraine. The village was formed in 1427. It has 6,054 inhabitants.

Kosmach under Soviet rule 
In 1939, Kosmach, like the whole of Galicia, was captured by the Red Army. After 73 years of existence, the self-governing community of Kosmach, Kolomyia district, was transformed into a village council. Stalinist repressions affected the fate of hundreds of Kosmach residents. People's resistance against the terror of the occupiers grew. During the Second World War, the forces of the Ukrainian Insurgent Army were firmly entrenched in Kosmach.  At the end of September 1943, the UNS "Skuby" unit gained a victorious success in the fight against the Germans.  It organized an ambush on the road Kosmach-Kolomyia, which got four trucks with Germans. In the crossfire, the Nazis, according to Ukrainian data, lost up to seventy people killed. On October 5, 1943, soldiers of the UPA training camp fought with the Germans in the Polanytsia, Kutariv, Yavirnyk and Kucharky meadows.  The enemy retreated, leaving 20 killed and 20 wounded."

References

External links 
my-kosmach.com.ua

Villages in Kosiv Raion